Pyramid Mountain is a subglacial mound located on the Murtle Plateau in Wells Gray Provincial Park, east-central British Columbia, Canada.

Formation
Pyramid Mountain erupted about 12,000 years ago. The volcano erupted vigorously and cooled rapidly when the hot lava contacted the surrounding ice and melted it, creating an envelope of water around the rising volcano. The result was a cement-like surface with smoothed cobbles of granite, schist, phyllite and other non-volcanic pebbles which were carried by the ice from many kilometers distant. As a result of this type of eruption, Pyramid Mountain has no crater and no lava flows stretching away from its base. The secondary cone to the east (best seen from Clearwater Valley Road near Hemp Creek) was not formed by a separate eruption, but was simply a slump when the ice melted away from Pyramid, releasing the pressure against its slopes.

Access
Pyramid Mountain can be viewed from Wells Gray Park roads at three locations:
 1 km south of Hemp Creek on Clearwater Valley Road
 Green Mountain viewing tower (see picture above)
 Majerus Farm trailhead on Clearwater Valley Road

The trail to the top of Pyramid Mountain starts at Pyramid Campground. The view is mostly southward to Trophy Mountain, Battle Mountain and Dunn Peak. The Murtle River flows along the east and south sides of Pyramid. In some weather conditions, the plume of spray over Helmcken Falls can be seen to the west.

References

See also
 List of volcanoes in Canada
 Volcanism of Canada
 Volcanism of Western Canada
 Wells Gray-Clearwater volcanic field
 Pyramid Mountain (disambiguation)

Volcanoes of British Columbia
One-thousanders of British Columbia
Subglacial mounds of Canada
Pleistocene volcanoes
Wells Gray-Clearwater
Kamloops Division Yale Land District